The Revd. John Robert Lunn (8 March 1831 – 1899) was an organist and clergyman based in England.

Life

He was born on 8 March 1831 at Cleeve Prior, Worcestershire. He received music lessons from age 4 in organ under George Hollins and piano from W. H. Sharman.

He was educated at King Edward VI School and was appointed organist of Edgbaston Parish Church age 15.

He went up to Cambridge University in 1849. He graduated B.A. (fourth wrangler) 1853 ; M.A., 1856. He was ordained Deacon in the Church of England, 1855, and priest in 1856.

He was Fellow, and Sadlerian Lecturer, St. John's College, Cambridge and President of the University Musical Society

He was appointed vicar of Marton cum Grafton, Yorkshire in 1863.

Appointments

Organist of St Bartholomew's Church, Edgbaston Birmingham 1846–47
Vicar of Marton-cum-Grafton 1863–99

Compositions

His compositions include:
Oratorio, St. Paulinus of York 1892
Two Motets, for two choirs and organ
Motet, Heaven is my throne, eight-part chorus (MS.)
Communion Service in E, King's Chapel, Cambridge, 1 November 1861. 
Te Deum and Benedictus in E, for two choirs and organ, Cambridge, 1862. 
Priest's part for Aylward's Responses 
Hymn tunes, etc. 
Arrangements for pianoforte 4 hands and harmonium, of Bennett's Woman of Samaria, and other works

References

1831 births
1899 deaths
English organists
British male organists
English composers
19th-century British composers
19th-century English musicians
19th-century British male musicians
19th-century organists